2009 UEFA European Under-17 Football Championship (qualifying round) is the first round of qualifications for the Final Tournament of UEFA U-17 Championship 2009. 
The qualifying round was played between September 15 and October 28, 2008. The 52 teams were divided into 13 groups of four teams, with each group being contested as a mini-tournament, hosted by one of the group's teams. After all matches have been played, the 13 group winners and 13 group runners-up will advance to the Elite round. If two or more teams are tied in points, a tie-break will apply according to the following criteria:
 Higher number of points obtained in the group matches played among the teams in question;
 Superior goal difference resulting from the group matches played among the teams in question;
 Higher number of goals scored in the group matches played among the teams in question;
 If, after having applied criteria 1. to 3., two teams still have an equal ranking, criteria 1. to 3. will be reapplied to determine the ranking of the two teams. If this procedure does not lead to a decision, criteria 5. and 6. will apply.
 Results of all group matches:
 Superior goal difference.
 Higher number of goals scored.
 Drawing of lots.

Alongside the 26 winner and runner-up teams, the two best third-placed teams also qualify. These are determined after considering only their results against their group's top two teams, and applying the following criteria in this order:
Higher number of points obtained in these matches;
Superior goal difference from these matches;
Higher number of goals scored in these matches;
Fair-play conduct of the teams in all group matches in the qualifying round;
Drawing of lots.

The host team of each group's mini-tournament are indicated in italics in the tables below.

Group stage

Group 1

Group 2

Group 3

Group 4

Group 5

Group 6

Group 7

Group 8

Group 9

Group 10

Group 11

Group 12

Group 13

Third-placed teams 
Kazakhstan and Georgia advanced for the elite round as the two best third-placed teams.

References

External links 
 – uefa.com

Qualification
UEFA European Under-17 Championship qualification